NGC 1988 is a star which is located in the Taurus constellation. It was recorded by Jean Chacornac on October 19, 1855.

References

1988
Taurus (constellation)